Spring Awakening (German: Frühlingserwachen) is a 1929 German silent drama film directed by Richard Oswald and starring Mathilde Sussin, Toni van Eyck and Paul Henckels. It is an adaptation of the play of the same title by Frank Wedekind. It is part of the cycle of Enlightenment films made during the Weimar era.

Cast
 Mathilde Sussin as Frau Bergmann 
 Toni van Eyck as Wendla, her daughter 
 Paul Henckels as Bürovorsteher Stiefel 
 Carl Balhaus as Moritz, his son 
 Rolf von Goth as Melchoir Gabor 
 Ita Rina as Ilse 
 Willy Clever as the painter Fahrendorf
 Valy Arnheim as the rector
 Fritz Rasp as the teacher Habebald
 Bernhard Goetzke as another teacher
 Sigi Hofer as Pedell

See also
Spring Awakening (1924)

References

Bibliography
Prawer, S.S. Between Two Worlds: The Jewish Presence in German and Austrian Film, 1910–1933. Berghahn Books, 2005.

External links

1929 films
Films of the Weimar Republic
1929 drama films
German silent feature films
German drama films
German coming-of-age films
Films directed by Richard Oswald
Films about suicide
Films about abortion
Films based on works by Frank Wedekind
German films based on plays
Juvenile sexuality in films
German black-and-white films
Remakes of Austrian films
Silent drama films
1920s German films